David Evan Jones, Mizo name Zosaphluia (15 February 1870 – 10 August 1947) was a Welsh missionary in Mizoram, India, connected to both the Mizoram Presbyterian Church and the Baptist Church of Mizoram.

Jones was born at Brynmelyn, Llandderfel. educated at Bala Grammar School, then the Liverpool Institute, Bala College and the Presbyterian United Theological College, Aberystwyth. He was pastor of a church in Bettws, Montgomery, for two years before being formally ordained into the English Baptists in 1897 prior to sailing for India on 26 June 1897. He arrived at Aizawl, in the Lushai Hills, two months later on 31 August. 
While in the Lushai Hills area, he spent Christmas in the hamlet of Pukpui, and stayed there for Christmas.

Marriage
In 1903, he married Katherine Ellen Williams, at Sylhet (now Bangladesh).

Mizo language
Jones learnt the Mizo language from Scottish missionaries James Herbert Lorrain and Fred W. Savidge who had devised the Lushai language alphabet. and became a member of team making Bible translations into the local languages - the Lakher language and Lushai language.

Last years and death
David Evan Jones retired after 30 years in Mizoram in 1927 and returned to Britain to live at Liverpool and Prestatyn. He died at Prestatyn, on 10 August 1947, aged 77. His widow died on 20 May 1950.

See also
 Baptist Church of Mizoram

References

External links
 D. E. Jones ‘Zosaphluia’ and his wife with a group of Mizo evangelists in 1916.

1870 births
1947 deaths
Welsh Presbyterian missionaries
Baptist missionaries in India
Translators of the Bible into Mizo
Welsh Baptist missionaries
Presbyterian missionaries in India
Missionary linguists